Luke 19 is the nineteenth chapter of the Gospel of Luke in the New Testament of the Christian Bible. It records Jesus' arrival in Jericho and his meeting with Zacchaeus, the parable of the minas and Jesus' arrival in Jerusalem. The book containing this chapter is anonymous, but early Christian tradition uniformly affirmed that Luke the Evangelist composed this Gospel as well as the Acts of the Apostles.

Text

The original text was written in Koine Greek. This chapter is divided into 48 verses.

Textual witnesses
Some early manuscripts containing the text of this chapter are:
Papyrus 75 (AD 175-225)
Codex Vaticanus (325-350)
Codex Sinaiticus (330-360)
Codex Bezae (~400)
Codex Washingtonianus (~400)
Codex Alexandrinus (400-440)
Codex Ephraemi Rescriptus (~450; extant verses 42-48)

Jesus comes to Zacchaeus’ house (19:1-10)

Zacchaeus ("pure", "innocent" ) of Jericho was wealthy, a chief tax collector, mentioned only in the Gospel of Luke. A descendant of Abraham, Zacchaeus is the epitome of someone meeting Jesus' in his earthly mission to bring salvation to the lost. Tax collectors were despised as traitors (working for the Roman Empire, not for their Jewish community), and as being corrupt. This encounter between Jesus and Zacchaeus "is a story of divine grace and the call to holiness". A Methodist/Roman Catholic ecumenical document reflects that

Parable of the minas (19:11-27)

Now as they heard these things, He spoke another parable, because He was near Jerusalem and because they thought the kingdom of God would appear immediately.
Hugo Grotius held that "they" (who heard these things) refers to the disciples. Heinrich Meyer argues that "they" were the murmurers of verse 7.

Meyer also notes some uncertainty regarding the chronology of events: verse 5 has Jesus planning to stay with Zacchaeus overnight, whereas verse 28 suggests a more immediate departure for Jerusalem after the telling of the parable.

Jesus' entry to Jerusalem (19:28-40)

On the downward slope of the Mount of Olives, there is a scene of great rejoicing:
"Blessed is the King who comes in the name of the Lord!
Peace in heaven and glory in the highest!"

As he drew near to the city, Jesus wept, anticipating the destruction of the Temple, an occasion known as Flevit super illam in Latin. Another occasion when Jesus wept is recorded in John's gospel following the death of his friend Lazarus. In his lament, Jesus states:
"If you had known, even you, especially in this your day, the things that make for your peace! But now they are hidden from your eyes. For days will come upon you when your enemies will build an embankment around you, surround you and close you in on every side, and level you, and your children within you, to the ground; and they will not leave in you one stone upon another, because you did not know the time of your visitation."

Lutheran biblical scholar Johann Bengel contrasts Jesus' reaction with the immediately preceding scene of rejoicing:
Behold before thee the compassionate King, amidst the very shouts of joy raised by His disciples!
Jesus weeps over Jerusalem, and yet compels no man by force.

The Jerusalem Bible suggests that "your peace" is a reference to "the peace of the messianic age".

Verse 28
When He had said this, He went on ahead, going up to Jerusalem.
In many translations, Jesus went on "ahead", i.e. "in front of" his disciples. Erasmus, Kypke, Kuinoel, Heinrich Ewald and others translate as "He went forwards", i.e. he pursued his journey, cf. the God's Word to the Nations translation, "he continued on his way".

Jesus in the Temple (19:41-48)

Verse 46
 [Jesus] Saying unto them, It is written, My house is the house of prayer: but ye have made it a den of thieves.
In expelling the dealers from the Temple, Jesus' words draw from both Isaiah 56:7 (a house of prayer for all nations) and Jeremiah 7:11 (a den of thieves). Matthew 21:13 and Mark 11:17 have the same quotations.

Verse 47
 And He was teaching daily in the temple. But the chief priests, the scribes, and the leaders of the people sought to destroy Him.

Verse 48
and [they] were unable to do anything; for all the people were very attentive to hear Him.
Literally, the people “were hanging from him”, i.e. hung on His lips. The Jerusalem Bible translates this as "the people as a whole hung on his words".

See also
 Jericho
 Mina
 Ministry of Jesus
 Parables of Jesus
 Sycamore tree
 Zacchaeus
 Related Bible parts: Isaiah 56, Jeremiah 7, Zechariah 9, Matthew 21, Matthew 25, Mark 11, John 2, John 12

References

Old Testament references 
 : Psalm 
 Luke 19:46: Isaiah 56:7; Jeremiah 7:11

External links 
 King James Bible - Wikisource
English Translation with Parallel Latin Vulgate
Online Bible at GospelHall.org (ESV, KJV, Darby, American Standard Version, Bible in Basic English)
Multiple bible versions at Bible Gateway (NKJV, NIV, NRSV etc.)

Gospel of Luke chapters